"Empires (Bring Me Men)" is a song by British singer Lamya, released in 2002. It was the first single taken from her debut album Learning from Falling.

It is based on a poem, The Coming American, commemorating the 75th anniversary of the American acquisition of the state of California, by American librarian and poet Samuel Walter Foss.

A remix of the song reached #1 on the Billboard Hot Dance Music/Club Play chart in 2002.

Track listing
CD single (Europe)
 Empires (Bring Me Men) (Radio edit) − 3:42
 Empires (Bring Me Men) (Sander Kleinenberg Audio Paranoid Mix) − 8:42

CD single (Europe)
 Empires (Bring Me Men) (Radio edit) − 3:42
 Empires (Bring Me Men) (Sander Kleinenberg Audio Paranoid Mix) − 8:42
 Empires (Bring Me Men) (Bent Mix) − 6:59
 Empires (Bring Me Men) (video) − 3:42

Vinyl 12" (USA)
 Empires (Bring Me Men) (Widelife Main Room Tribal Mix) − 9:17
 Empires (Bring Me Men) (That Kid Chris Remix) − 8:56

Vinyl 12" (USA)
 Empires (Bring Me Men) (Sander Kleinenberg Audio Paranoid Club Mix) − 8:36
 Empires (Bring Me Men) (That Kid Chris Mix) − 8:56
 Empires (Bring Me Men) (Junior Vasquez "Bring Me Men" Anthem Mix) − 9:59
 Empires (Bring Me Men) (Illicit Siren Mix) − 8:55

References

2002 debut singles
Lamya songs
Songs based on poems
Song recordings produced by Nellee Hooper
2002 songs